Sam Brenegan (born Olaf Selmar Brenegan) was a Major League Baseball catcher. He was a member of the Pittsburgh Pirates in 1914. During his one and only game, Brenegan was hit in the hand while catching, which allowed a baserunner to move from second to third. For some time afterwards, any catcher who was hit hard in the hand by the ball was said to have "pulled a brenegan".

References

People from Galesville, Wisconsin
Baseball players from Wisconsin
Pittsburgh Pirates players
Major League Baseball catchers
1890 births
1956 deaths
Petersburg Goobers players
Portland Beavers players
Spokane Indians players
Rockford Wakes players
Hannibal Mules players
Dayton Veterans players
Muskegon Muskies players
St. Joseph Saints players